Keiko Furukawa (Japanese:古川 圭子, Furukawa Keiko, real name: Keiko Kamei (亀井圭子)) is an announcer for MBS. She joined the company in 1993. Her birthday is January 30. She is married to Mareo Kamei, who also works at MBS and is two years her senior.

Appearances
 Television
 MBS News

References

Japanese women journalists
Living people
Japanese broadcast news analysts
1967 births
Women television journalists